Bathytoma wairarapaensis is an extinct species of sea snail, a marine gastropod mollusk in the family Borsoniidae. As the species name implies, it was described from the Wairarapa.

Distribution
This extinct marine species was found from fossils endemic to New Zealand. The fossils date back to the end of the Cenozoic era.

Description
The length of the shell attains 27 mm, its diameter 15.5 mm.

References

 P Vella, Tertiary Mollusca from south-east Wairarapa; Transactions of the Royal Society of New Zealand, 1954
 Maxwell, P.A. (2009). Cenozoic Mollusca. pp 232–254 in Gordon, D.P. (ed.) New Zealand inventory of biodiversity. Volume one. Kingdom Animalia: Radiata, Lophotrochozoa, Deuterostomia. Canterbury University Press, Christchurch.

wairarapaensis
Gastropods of New Zealand